Te Hapimana Tauke (1810 – 2 June 1915) was a notable New Zealand tribal leader, mission teacher and historian. Of Māori descent, he identified with the Nga Ruahine and Ngati Ruanui iwi. He was born in the Waikato, in about 1810.

References

1810 births
1915 deaths
20th-century New Zealand historians
New Zealand Māori schoolteachers
Ngāti Ruanui people
Ngāruahine people
New Zealand Māori writers
19th-century New Zealand historians